Ernest Harry "Tim" Killick (17 January 1875 – 29 September 1948) was an English first-class cricketer who played for Sussex from 1893 to 1913.

In 1911, Killick earned an unwanted place in cricket history. In the first innings against Nottinghamshire he took 5 for 14, but in the second innings Ted Alletson hit one of his overs for 34 runs. For 57 years, this was the most runs scored in an over of first-class cricket, until it was surpassed in 1968 by Garry Sobers, who hit 36 off Malcolm Nash.

In the United Kingdom, wearing glasses was characterised in the nineteenth century, as "a sure sign of the weakling and the mollycoddle", according to Neville Cardus, writing in 1928. Tim Killick was the first professional cricketer to play while wearing glasses "continuously", after his vision deteriorated in 1897. "With their aid he placed himself in the forefront among English professionals of all-round abilities.”

His uncle, Harry Killick, also played first-class cricket.

References

External links
 

1875 births
1948 deaths
English cricketers
Sussex cricketers
Players cricketers
North v South cricketers
Players of the South cricketers
People from Horsham